Carey School is a K-12 school in the Blaine County School District and serves the rural farming community of Carey, Idaho. The high school is located on the same campus that includes an elementary and junior high school, encompassing Carey School.

The Carey High School football team was the 2006 and 2008 state champion in 1A Division II eight-man football in Idaho, their fourth state championship title. The Carey girls basketball have gone to state three years in a row. They have gotten consolation, 3rd and 2nd. In 2018, they won state championship in 1A Division II. Some of the most intense rivalries Carey has in sports have been with Richfield, Dietrich and in the past Shoshone High School.

References

Public high schools in Idaho
Schools in Blaine County, Idaho